Xətai District is a raion in Baku, Azerbaijan. It contains the Əhmədli municipality.

Gallery

References 

Azerbaijan government

Districts of Baku